Sammy Barbot (born in 1949), stage name of Jacques Édouard Barbot, is a Caribbean entertainer, singer and television presenter, mainly active in Italy.

Life and career 
Born in Martinique, at young age Barbot moved to Paris with his family. In the early 1970s he started singing in restaurants and clubs, and he eventually took part to the French version of the stage musical Hair.

In 1975 Barbot appeared in the film Hallucination Strip and performed the film's opening song "We've Got A Lord". The song appeared on the film's original soundtrack.

Noted by two RAI Italian television writers, in 1977 he moved to Italy to host the musical show Piccolo Slam, of which he also sang the two theme songs. In 1979 he hosted Popcorn, a successful Canale 5 show  he had also ideated.

In 1981 Barbot got his major hit, "Aria di casa mia", the opening theme song of his TV show Happy Circus, which peaked at the fifth place on the Italian hit parade.

In the following years he continued his musical and television activities, slowing his activities in the second half of the 1980s.

Discography
Singles
 
     1969 - L'amore è blu/L'ultimo    
     1973 - Amico/Girl You 'R' Right    
     1975 - Mark/So much love   
     1976 - Season of assassins/Gang leader    
     1976 - Signor Robinson/L'isola di Robinson   
     1977 - El Macho/Macho's slams   
     1977 - Non legarti a me/Disco slam    
     1977 - Toccami/Piccolo slam    
     1978 - New Mexico/Take my music    
     1980 - California/California (versione strumentale)   
     1981 - Aria di casa/Liberazion   
     1982 - Forza campione (parte 1)/Forza campione (parte 2)    
     1983 - Vita semplice/Donna vieni via    
     1983 - Non sarai più sola/Di' di no    
     1984 - Let The Music Play/Love Sensation    
     1984 - Groovy/Groovy (remix)    
     1985 - Music, harmony and rhythm medley with Brazilian Rhyme   
     1986 - Tempo d'estate/Tempo d'estate (versione strumentale)   
     2007 - Rainbow Imagine

Album 
  
     1973 - Un testo, una musica (BBB, BSLB 0009)
     1977 - Sammy! (Dischi Ricordi, SMRL 6215)
     1983 - Barbot L.P. (WEA Italiana)

References

External links

 

1949 births
Martiniquais singers
Italian pop singers
Italian male singers
Living people
French emigrants to Italy
Italian television presenters
Caribbean musicians